Tommie Florence Brown (born 1934) is a former representative of Chattanooga to the Tennessee state legislature from 1992 through 2012 and a member of the Democratic Party.

Brown was born in 1934 at Rome, Georgia, the first of 3 children of Mary Louise and Phillip Brown Sr, and grew up in Chattanooga.
 
Brown earned her BA from Dillard University in New Orleans, Louisiana, MSW from the George Warren Brown School of Social Work at Washington University in St. Louis, and DSW and PhD in Social Work from the Columbia University School of Social Work. Brown worked as a child welfare case manager, supervisor and regional field director for training for the Tennessee Department of Welfare, and taught Social Work Research at the University of Tennessee at Chattanooga from 1971 – 1998, including the position of University of Chattanooga Foundation Associate Professor of Social Work.

Brown was the lead plaintiff of 12 in Brown v. Board of Commissioners of the City of Chattanooga, which the plaintiffs won in 1989, against the systematic political alienation of local African Americans as the primary minority voter bloc that could never achieve political representation due to majority White rule.

In 1992 Brown was elected to represent the Tennessee 28th District, a part Chattanooga in Hamilton County and served seven terms in office, succeeding C.B. Robinson, the first African American male elected to represent the area in the state legislature.  She served for 20 years on the Finance Ways and Means committee, was vice-chair of the House of Representatives' Education Committee and chair of Subcommittee on Higher Education, and member of the Children and Family committee and Domestic Relations Subcommittee. Republican control of both state House and Senate allowed for legislative re-districting which merged two historically African-American legislative districts into one, pitting Brown against JoAnne Favors, a fellow state representative and former campaign manager.

Brown was named National Social Worker of the Year Award in 1970, and a Hamilton County Magnet Elementary School (grades K-5), is named after her: "The Dr. Tommie F. Brown Academy for Classical Studies", now called "Tommie F. Brown International Academy", opened next to the University of Tennessee at Chattanooga in 2002.

References

1934 births
Living people
People from Rome, Georgia
Columbia University School of Social Work alumni
Dillard University alumni
George Warren Brown School of Social Work alumni
Women state legislators in Tennessee
African-American state legislators in Tennessee
Democratic Party members of the Tennessee House of Representatives
University of Tennessee at Chattanooga faculty